Extreme-G is a futuristic racing video game developed by Probe Entertainment and published by Acclaim Entertainment, featuring an original trance soundtrack. It was released for the Nintendo 64 in 1997, and was released in Japan on May 29, 1998. Despite the crowded field of Nintendo 64 racing games, Extreme-G was met with moderately positive reviews and was a commercial success. A sequel, Extreme-G 2, was released in 1998, followed by two additional games: Extreme-G 3 and XGRA: Extreme G Racing Association.

Gameplay

The gameplay of Extreme-G consists mainly of fast-paced racing through an array of futuristic environments. An array of defensive and offensive weapons are available on-track. These include multi-homing/reverse missiles, magnetic/laser mines, and shield-boosting power-ups. Special weapons can also be found such as invisibility, phosphorus flash and the mighty Wally-Warp which if not avoided, can instantly transport a bike right to the back of the pack.

As with all Extreme-G games, futuristic racing pilots race plasma-powered bikes in an intergalactic Grand Prix at speeds over 750 km/h. The emphasis is on speed and racetrack design, with tracks looping through like roller coasters.

At the beginning of each round, the player is given three "nitro" powerups which provide a temporary speed boost (these powerups cannot be replenished). Also, falling off cliffs or, in some cases, the track itself results in simply losing time rather than losing 'lives'; bikes are teleported back to the track and must rebuild their speed and lost time from a dead standstill.

The single player games come in three difficulty settings: Novice, Intermediate and Extreme. The main game mode (Extreme Contest) features three championships: Atomic (four tracks), Critical Mass (eight tracks) and Meltdown (full 12 standard tracks). The player must come first in each championship to progress. Winning championships on the various difficulty levels will open up the hidden bikes, levels and cheats. Once the levels have been opened they can be used for the additional single and multi-player modes.

The multi-player modes include competitive racing, flag capture, and battle mode.

Plot
Extreme-G is set in the distant future where Earth is reduced into a wasteland. From their new-found planet the human colonists watch their remote controlled bikes wreak havoc through their ancient cities and fight their way to determine which racer manages to qualify.

Development
Extreme-G was developed under the working title "Ultimate Racer". It was created by Probe Entertainment, an internal development team of Acclaim Entertainment.

Reception

Extreme-G received "favorable" reviews according to the review aggregation website Metacritic. Critics particularly praised the track designs with their numerous loops, jumps, and corkscrews, and the sense of speed. Crispin Boyer wrote in Electronic Gaming Monthly that no other title delivers sense of speed than Extreme-G. Next Generation said the game has fast, futuristic, heavily armed speedbikes with rollercoaster tracks in some hallucinogenic scenarios. A few critics remarked that the intense speeds give the game a steep learning curve, but that ultimately the controls work well. Edge criticized the handling of the bikes, but highlighted the game's emphasis on combat.

The bike designs were also applauded, with several reviewers likening their look to that of the movie Tron. GameRevolution praised the game's replay value due to the large number of tracks, weapons and multiplayer options. Critics in general complimented the selection of modes and options, though there were some complaints that the multiplayer modes are not as strong as the single-player. Several noted slowdown and choppiness in the otherwise strong frame rate when four players are racing, Shawn Smith of Electronic Gaming Monthly said the tracks in the multiplayer Battle mode are dull and unimaginative, and Next Generation simply said that four-player Extreme-G bike deathmatches was a decent idea, but flawed. Most critics remarked that the techno soundtrack is unoriginal but does its job of enhancing the mood of the intense races. Though many criticized the use of distance fog, reviews unanimously declared the game's graphics to be outstanding.

Most reviews concluded that while a handful of shortcomings keep Extreme-G from being a top-ranked game, it was impressive enough to recommend. GamePro, for instance, wrote that Extreme G will keep N64 racers sated until F-Zero 64 debuts. Similarly, Peer Schneider of IGN opined that it can't compete with Wave Race 64 and Top Gear Rally in terms of graphics, physics and control, but ultimately recommended it for action and racing fans.

According to N64 Magazine, Extreme-G was a commercial success, selling 700,000 copies by October 1998.

Notes

References

External links
 

1997 video games
Acclaim Entertainment games
Science fiction racing games
Nintendo 64 games
Nintendo 64-only games
Vehicular combat games
Video games developed in the United Kingdom